Fred or Frederick Keller may refer to:

 Fred S. Keller (1899–1996), American pioneer in experimental psychology
 Fred Keller (politician) (born 1965), American politician from Pennsylvania
 Frederick King Keller (born 1954), American director, producer and screenwriter

See also
 Friedrich Keller (disambiguation) 
 Fred Kelly (disambiguation)